The 2014–15 season is FK Partizan's 9th season in Serbian SuperLiga. This article shows player statistics and all matches (official and friendly) that the club have and will play during the 2014–15 season.

Season overview

In summer 2014, Partizan has qualified to the UEFA Europa League  where they have won two points in a group with Tottenham, Beşiktaş and Asteras.

Partizan scored one goal in 2014–15 UEFA Europa League. That one goal scored Saša Marković vs Beşiktaş on Atatürk Olympic Stadium in Istanbul.
The first game in Europe was held on 15 July 2014 against HB Tórshavn on Partizan Stadium in UEFA Champions League Second qualifying round. That night Partizan won 3-0, in a rematch also won 3-1, and passed in Third qualifying round. In the third qualifying round Partizan's opponent was Ludogorets Razgrad. In Razgrad the match was played without goals, but in Belgrade it was 2-2. Ludogorets won on away goals. In Play-off round UEFA Europa League Partizan played against Neftchi Baku. First game in Belgrade Partizan won 3-2,in that game 2 own goals were witnessed, but in Baku Partizan  also won n 2-1. On 18 September Partizan played against Tottenham in Belgrade. In this game there was no winner and the result was 0-0.Partizan was attacking and had more shots from Tottenham. On 23 October Partizan played against Beşiktaş and lost 0-4. In this match Škuletić was played first time in UEFA Europa League after the suspension of 2 game. On 25 March manager Marko Nikolić replaced Zoran Milinković as the head coach at the club.

Marko Nikolic was sacked because of poor performance in the spring part although he had a contract until the end of the season. On 4 April Milinkovic debuted on the Partizan bench against Radnički 1923. In that match Partizan won n 2-1. Same day Partizans biggest rival Red Star  lost and so Partizan went from  +2 to +5. On 13 May Partizan won against Napredak Kruševac and won the title of Serbian champion. Then Partizan won 26 title and equalized with the biggest rival (Red Star) by number of champion titles.

In Serbian Cup, Partizan came to the finals by beating FK Bežanija 1-0, 3-0 FK Sloga Petrovac na Mlavi and Rad 1-0.In the semi-finals Partizan won against Jagodina Total score 5-0. To the finals Partizan won all his matches without conceding a goal. On 20 May in the final Partizan lost to Čukarički 1-0.And he didn't won the double crown.

Transfers

In

Out

For recent transfers, see List of Serbian football transfers winter 2014–15. For summer transfers, see List of Serbian football transfers summer 2014.

Players

Squad

Competitions

Overview

Serbian SuperLiga

League table

Results and positions by round

Matches

Serbian Cup

Serbian Cup

UEFA Champions League

Second qualifying round

Third qualifying round

UEFA Europa League

Play-off round

Group stage

Friendlies

Statistics

Goalscorers
This includes all competitive matches. The list is sorted by shirt number when total goals are equal.

Last Updated: 4 June 2015Source: Competitive matches

Assists
This includes all competitive matches.  The list is sorted by shirt number when total assists are equal.

Disciplinary record

Club world ranking
These are the IFFHS club's points as of May 2014:
In the "Top 100″ there are clubs from 42 countries: 67 clubs from UEFA, 22 from CONMEBOL, six from AFC, three from CONCACAF, two from CAF and none from OFC. The following leagues are represented by the most clubs in the Top 100 :Spain (7), Argentina (7), Brazil (6), England (6), Germany (6), Italy (6), France (5). Under the global ranking, the Top 10 for each of the football continents, South America, Africa, Asia and CONCACAF and also the TOP 500

See also

 List of FK Partizan seasons
 2014–15 UEFA Champions League
 2014–15 UEFA Europa League
 2014–15 Serbian Cup
 2014–15 Serbian SuperLiga

External links
 Partizanopedia 2014-15

References

FK Partizan seasons
Partizan
Serbian football championship-winning seasons